

Otto-Joachim Lüdecke (27 May 1894 – 14 February 1971) was a German general during World War II. He was a recipient of the Knight's Cross of the Iron Cross of Nazi Germany.

Awards and decorations 

 Knight's Cross of the Iron Cross on 8 August 1943 as Generalmajor and commander of 56. Infanterie-Division

References

Citations

Bibliography

 

1890s births
1971 deaths
People from Staßfurt
Lieutenant generals of the German Army (Wehrmacht)
German Army personnel of World War I
Recipients of the clasp to the Iron Cross, 1st class
Recipients of the Knight's Cross of the Iron Cross
German prisoners of war in World War II held by the United Kingdom
People from the Province of Saxony
Military personnel from Saxony-Anhalt
German Army generals of World War II